Little Big Shot is a 1935 American film directed by Michael Curtiz, starring Sybil Jason and Glenda Farrell. The film was released by Warner Bros. on September 7, 1935. A young girl endears herself to her caretakers after her father is murdered by mobsters.

Plot
Mortimer Thompson (Edward Everett Horton) and Steve Craig (Robert Armstrong) are a pair of sidewalk confidence men working Broadway one step ahead of the police selling phony watches. Broke, they arrange to have dinner with Gibbs, an old friend, thinking he will help them with some money. Gibbs and his young daughter Gloria (Sybil Jason) don't have much money, either, and think that Steve and Mortimer can help them.  On top of needing money, Gibbs is in hiding from notorious gangster Kell Norton. After Steve, Mortimer, Gibbs and Gloria finish their dinner, Gibbs is shot and killed by Norton's men as the group leaves the restaurant. Steve and Mortimer hurry to leave before they too get shot, hastily leaving Gibbs' daughter Gloria behind. Steve reminds Mortimer that they forgot about Gloria. Despite Mortimer's protestations, Steve convinces him to go back for the girl.

Gloria stays with Steve and Mortimer for a night at their place. Gloria takes Mortimer's bed, so Mortimer has to sleep in the bathroom. Steve tries to put Gloria in an orphanage but feels bad when she begins to cry. Steve and Mortimer try to care for Gloria with the help of Jean (Glenda Farrell), a hat check girl at their residential hotel. Steve and Mortimer find out that Gloria can sing and dance, so they get her to perform on the street with them. Gloria also helps them sell their fake watches until Jean finds out. Jean expresses her displeasure, but Steve and Mortimer continue using Gloria.

Jean has Gloria put in an orphanage because Steve and Mortimer aren't responsible enough to take care of her. Steve wins a craps game with small-time hoodlum Jack Doré (Jack La Rue) to raise money, but Doré refuses to pay off the gambling debt and Steve threatens to get him. Later Norton kills Doré and passes Steve as he is arriving to ask Doré for his winnings again so he can adopt Gloria. Steve becomes the suspect for the crime. Norton realizes Steve is a witness against him and tries to find him to shut him up. To force Steve out of hiding, he kidnaps Gloria. Steve convinces the gangsters to let Gloria go and take him instead. Just as Norton's gang is about to kill Steve, the police (tipped off by Mortimer and Jean) arrive at the hideout. His name cleared, Steve marries Jean and they adopt Gloria. Steve, Jean, Gloria, and Mortimer move from the city and open a roadside café.

Cast 
 Sybil Jason as Gloria 'Countess' Gibbs
 Glenda Farrell as Jean
 Robert Armstrong as Steve Craig
 Edward Everett Horton as Mortimer Thompson
 Jack La Rue as Jack Doré 
 Arthur Vinton as Kell 'Nort' Norton
 J. Carrol Naish as Bert
 Edgar Kennedy as Onderdonk
 Addison Richards as Hank Gibbs

Production
Warner Bros. hired five-year-old South African Sybil Jason to compete with Shirley Temple. This was the first American screen debut of Jason. Byron Haskins finished the photography on the film, but only Tony Gaudio received screen credit for the movie. In the film, Sybil Jason does imitations of Greta Garbo, Mae West and Jimmy Durante.

Songs
Music and lyrics by Frank Dixon and Allie Wrubel:
I'm a Little Big Shot Now
Rolling in the Money
My Kid's a Crooner

Reception
Andre Senwald of The New York Times writes in his movie review: "Convinced that Hollywood is suffering from a drought rather than a plague of baby Bernhardts, Warner Brothers have imported a new one, Miss Sybil Jason, from South Africa. She performs all the triple-threat functions in "Little Big Shot", including a couple of impersonations and a song and dance. An engaging infant, she suffers just now from a studied quality that may be the result of overdirection. In some of her big emotional close-ups, the bewildered little girl seems to be making a valiant effort to take advice from half a dozen assistant directors all at once. Then, too, there is the additional difficulty that her British accent makes many of her lines unintelligible."

References

External links

1935 films
Films directed by Michael Curtiz
1935 crime films
American crime films
American black-and-white films
Warner Bros. films
Films produced by Samuel Bischoff
Films scored by Heinz Roemheld
1930s English-language films
1930s American films